Boutonniere deformity is a deformed position of the fingers or toes, in which the joint nearest the knuckle (the proximal interphalangeal joint, or PIP) is permanently bent toward the palm while the farthest joint (the distal interphalangeal joint, or DIP) is bent back away (PIP flexion with DIP hyperextension). Causes include injury, inflammatory conditions like rheumatoid arthritis, and genetic conditions like Ehlers-Danlos syndrome.

Pathophysiology
This flexion deformity of the proximal interphalangeal joint is due to interruption of the central slip of the extensor tendon such that the lateral slips separate and the head of the proximal phalanx pops through the gap like a finger through a button hole (thus the name, from French boutonnière "button hole"). The distal joint is subsequently drawn into hyperextension because the two peripheral slips of the extensor tendon are stretched by the head of the proximal phalanx (note that the two peripheral slips are inserted into the distal phalanx, while the proximal slip is inserted into the middle phalanx). This deformity makes it difficult or impossible to extend the proximal interphalangeal joint.

Diagnosis

Stages
 Mild extension lag, passively correctable  	 
 Moderate extension lag, passively correctable 	 
 Mild flexion contracture 	 
 Advanced flexion contracture 	

Higher numbers indicate a more severe problem and greater likelihood of a poor outcome.

Treatment
Usually treated with a splint placing the proximal interphalangeal joint in extension for 4–6 weeks. Occasionally surgery is needed when splinting is unsuccessful.

See also 
 Swan neck deformity
 Z-deformity

References

Further reading

External links 

Arthritis